The Special Areas (Amendment) Act of 1937 was an Act of the Parliament of the United Kingdom which amended the Special Areas Act 1934.  The new Act introduced concessions on taxes and rents to encourage businesses to set up in the locations which benefited from the 1934 Act.

References

United Kingdom Acts of Parliament 1937